The 2013 Levene Gouldin & Thompson Tennis Challenger was a professional tennis tournament played on hard court. It was the 19th edition of the tournament which was part of the 2013 ATP Challenger Tour. It took place in Binghamton, United States between 15 and 21 July 2013.

Singles main-draw entrants

Seeds

 1 Rankings are as of July 9, 2013.

Other entrants
The following players received wildcards into the singles main draw:
  Jarmere Jenkins
  Dennis Novikov
  Rhyne Williams
  Donald Young

The following players received entry from the qualifying draw:
  Takanyi Garanganga
  Mitchell Krueger
  Frederik Nielsen
  Greg Ouellette

Champions

Singles

 Alex Kuznetsov def.  Bradley Klahn, 6–4, 3–6, 6–3

Doubles

 Bradley Klahn /  Michael Venus def.  Adam Feeney /  John-Patrick Smith, 6–3, 6–4

External links
Official Website

 
Levene Gouldin and Thompson Tennis Challenger
Levene Gouldin and Thompson Tennis Challenger
Levene Gouldin and Thompson Tennis Challenger
Levene Gouldin & Thompson Tennis Challenger